"You're a Woman" is a song by Bad Boys Blue, released in April 1985 as the second single from their debut studio album, Hot Girls, Bad Boys (1985). It was a hit across Europe, reaching number 8 in West Germany, number 1 in Austria and number 2 in Switzerland.

Track listing and formats 

 European 7-inch single

A. "You're a Woman" – 3:57
B. "You're a Woman" (Instrumental) – 4:40

 European 12-inch maxi-single

A. "You're a Woman" (Long Version) – 5:19
B. "You're a Woman" (Instrumental) – 3:49

Charts

Weekly charts

Year-end charts

Prudence Liew version 

In 1987, the song was covered under the title "The Last Night (最後一夜)" with different lyrics in Cantonese and English and released as a single by Hong Kong pop singer Prudence Liew.

It was the second single from the album Prudence Liew. The track featured a heavy dance beat that proved to be very popular with the Hong Kong disco scene. The popularity of this song propelled Liew's status in the music scene and it is still considered to be her signature song.

Track listing and formats 

 Hong Kong 12-inch single

A. "The Last Night (最後一夜)" (Rearranged Disco Version) – 6:47
B. "Neon Bird (霓虹鳥)" (Rearranged Disco Version) – 6:48

You're a Woman '98 

Bad Boys Blue released a new version of the song under the title "You're a Woman '98" as a single in 1998. It was the lead single from their album Back. This re-release reached number 52 in Germany and number 4 in Finland.

Track listing and formats 

 German CD maxi-single

 "You're a Woman" (Original Remix 1998) – 3:48
 "You're a Woman" (Rap Remix 1998) – 3:19
 "Megamix Volume 1" – 8:17
 "You're a Woman" (Extended Rap Remix 1998) – 5:11

Charts

References 

1985 songs
1985 singles
1986 singles
Bad Boys Blue songs
Coconut Records singles
Number-one singles in Austria
Prudence Liew songs
Songs with lyrics by Mary Susan Applegate
Songs written by Tony Hendrik